Wawota Airport, formerly , was located adjacent to Wawota, Saskatchewan, Canada.

See also 
 List of airports in Saskatchewan
 List of defunct airports in Canada

References 

Defunct airports in Saskatchewan